is a public park that straddles the Nerima and Itabashi wards of Tokyo in Japan. The western half of the park lies in Nerima Ward, while the eastern half is in Itabashi Ward. The park opened on 1 April 1957.

Sports facilities
Jōhoku-Chūō Park has two main Japanese-style baseball fields and two small baseball fields (for softball and junior Japanese-style baseball). It also has an athletics stadium (dirt surface), tennis courts (four hard courts, four clay courts, one artificial grass court), and a gymnasium called .

Nature
The main trees and plants that can be found in the park include Chinese parasol tree, ginkgo, Japanese zelkova, cherry (someiyoshino), sawara cypress, sasanqua, azalea and camellia. Further, Tama Zoological Park cultivates Eucalyptus in six locations in Japan as food for its koalas, and Jōhoku-Chūō Park is one of them. Nine kinds of Eucalyptus are grown here.

Archaeological sites
Both the Kurihara Ruins and the Moro Heritage Site are located in the park.

Retention basin

A retention basin is currently being constructed in the park to handle excess water in the Shakujii River particularly during times of torrential rainfall. Expropriation of residential land in the area between Oyama High School and Shakujii River began in the mid-2010s. The first phase of the construction started in January 2018, and it is scheduled to be completed in October 2024.

Gallery

See also
 Parks and gardens in Tokyo
 List of national parks of Japan

References

External links

  

 

Parks and gardens in Tokyo
Nerima
Itabashi
1957 establishments in Japan